The Yugoslavia women's national handball team was the national handball team of Yugoslavia. The team won the World Women's Handball Championship in 1973. Their achievements at the Olympic Games included a gold medal at the 1984 Summer Olympics in Los Angeles, silver medal at the 1980 Summer Olympics in Moscow, and 4th place at the 1988 Summer Olympics in Seoul.

Results

Summer Olympics

World Championship

References

Women's national handball teams
Former national handball teams
Hand
National team